Tsai Capital Corporation is a Manhattan-based investment management and advisory firm. The company was founded by Christopher Tsai in 1997. Tsai is the son of the late American financier Gerald Tsai. The firm follows a value-oriented investment approach and primarily focuses on high-quality, growth companies.

History

Tsai Capital was founded in 1997 by Christopher Tsai, who is the President and Chief Investment Officer of the firm. Since its foundation, the firm has maintained a focus on global equities and long-term investments. Tsai Capital manages money primarily for high net-worth individuals and family offices. The firm has invested in growth companies.

In 2011, Tsai Capital launched an equity fund. The fund launched with around $20 million in existing capital from current clients. It operates using similar precepts found in Tsai Capital's long-only, separate accounts. In 2010, Tsai Capital created a 5-member advisory committee. In July 2013, Kristofer Segerberg, formerly of Soros Fund Management, was appointed to the committee.

The firm invested in companies with exposure to Asia in 2014 and has also invested in American-based multinational corporations.

Operation

Since its inception, Tsai Capital has focused on businesses it believes have high upside potential and downside protection. Christopher Tsai has stated that the firm looks for asymmetric investment opportunities that it can hold for a long period of time. The firm believes in concentration as opposed to broad diversification and does not equate volatility with risk. The firm defines risk as the potential for permanent loss of capital. Tsai Capital invests on a global basis and seeks durability of growth rather than high growth in any one year.

References

External links

Investment management companies of the United States
Hedge fund firms in New York City
Privately held companies based in New York City
American companies established in 1997